The Blue Mountains Library is a network of six branch libraries located within the City of Blue Mountains Council administrative area.

History 
In 1963 following community pressure, the Blue Mountains City Council commissioned a report from the Library Board of NSW on the establishment of a free public library service. This was presented to Council 28 January 1964, where it was resolved not to adopt the Library Act due to the cost of providing the service. The report recommended a central library with administration at Katoomba and a full-time branch at Springwood with part-time branches at Lawson, Blackheath, and Wentworth Falls with a bookmobile service to outlying areas. Operating costs were based on a State Government subsidy of 3/- per capita and a Council contribution of 9/- per capita dropping to 7/- per capita in the third year of operation. Average library operating costs in NSW at the time were £0/10/4 per capita (In today's terms this equates to an approximate value of 10/- = $30.00, £1/0/0 = $60.00). So the status quo continued in the Blue Mountains, the public demand for library services was supplied by the various township literary institute libraries and by a number of small commercial subscription libraries. The Blue Mountains City Council paid an annual subsidy to a number of the Schools of Arts libraries to cover running costs and wages. Until finally, in 1967, after protracted debate and lobbying, Council adopted the Library Act and quickly came to an agreement with the remaining management committees to take over full operational responsibility for all public library services across the city.

By the end of 1975, branches were operating in Springwood, Katoomba, Blaxland, Lawson, Blackheath and Mount Victoria and the library had registered 16,033 borrowers from a population of just over 47,000. Only one central card catalogue existed until simplified author, title and subject print-outs were introduced to all branches in 1976, a Microfiche catalogue became available in 1978.

The Book Plus Library Management System was adopted in 1982 and an online public access catalogue was introduced in 1985. Public access PCs with dial-up Internet were introduced in 1998, this was later expanded to a broadband connection. The Horizon Library Management System was introduced in 2003. SirsiDynix Symphony was introduced in 2012.

Locations

Collections and services 
In addition to the network's collection of books the libraries provide for the loan of CDs, DVDs, magazines, newspapers, and non-English books. The libraries also provide internet, Wi-Fi, photocopying and printing services.

Membership 
The library serves a population of 79,812. The library has around 41,000 members and processes over 500,000 loans per year. Membership of the library network is free to residents of the City of Blue Mountains local government area.

References

External links 

Public libraries in Australia
Libraries in New South Wales
Blue Mountains (New South Wales)
Libraries established in 1974
1974 establishments in Australia